Elections to Penwith District Council were held for all 40 seats in 1976.

After the election, the composition of the council remained unchanged:
Independent - 37
Liberal - 1
Labour - 1
Others - 1

Results

See also

1973 Penwith District Council election
1979 Penwith District Council election

References
Penwith District Council Election Results 1973-2007

Penwith
Penwith District Council elections
1970s in Cornwall